Doron Sheffer (born 12 March 1972), is an Israeli retired professional basketball player. He spent most of his club career playing with Maccabi Tel Aviv. During his playing career he played at the point guard and shooting guard positions. During his playing days, his nickname was "The Iceman".

Early career
Sheffer first gained fame at age 21, in the Israeli Premier League, when he led Hapoel Galil Elyon to a victory in the Israeli League semifinals, over powerhouse Maccabi Tel Aviv, in 1993.

College career
Following fellow Israeli Nadav Henefeld, Sheffer then played college basketball, under head coach Jim Calhoun, at the University of Connecticut, with the UConn Huskies, from 1993 to 1996. In the 1993–94 season, Sheffer was the Big East Conference Rookie of the Year. While at UConn, Sheffer formed a trio with fellow starters Ray Allen and Kevin Ollie, that won the Big East basketball championship in three straight years. He is the only player from UConn with 1,000 points and 500 assists, in three varsity seasons.

He was named to the school's All-20th Century team.

Professional career
Sheffer was selected in the 1996 NBA Draft, by the Los Angeles Clippers, with the 36th overall pick, but he chose to sign with Maccabi Tel Aviv. After four years with Maccabi, where he won four straight Israeli League championships and played in the 2000 EuroLeague Final Four, Sheffer retired suddenly, walking away from the public's eye, to travel the world, to India, South America, and Costa Rica. During this time, he had a cancerous tumor removed from his testicles.

Despite the illness, and the time away from basketball, Sheffer decided to make a comeback. After finishing his contract with Maccabi, he signed with Hapoel Jerusalem. In 2004, he won the ULEB Eurocup (EuroCup) championship with Hapoel. Sheffer retired again in 2005, and then made another comeback in 2006. He then retired again in 2008. 5 years later, in 2013, he made a final comeback to the game, before finally retiring in 2014.

National team career
Sheffer was a member of the senior Israeli national basketball team. With Israel, he played at the 1993 EuroBasket, the 1995 EuroBasket, the 1997 EuroBasket, and the 1999 EuroBasket.

References

External links
 
 FIBA profile
 FIBA Europe profile
 Euroleague.net profile
 Israeli League profile
 Mccabi Tel Aviv profile
 Sports-Reference.com profile
 UConn Legends profile

1972 births
Living people
Baalei teshuva
Israeli Orthodox Jews
Point guards
Shooting guards
Israeli men's basketball players
Sportspeople from Petah Tikva
Hapoel Galil Elyon players
Maccabi Tel Aviv B.C. players
Hapoel Jerusalem B.C. players
Hapoel Tel Aviv B.C. players
Israeli Basketball Premier League players
Israeli expatriate basketball people in the United States
All-American college men's basketball players
Los Angeles Clippers draft picks
UConn Huskies men's basketball players